Harald Rabitsch was an Austrian luger who competed in the 1980s. A natural track luger, he won the bronze medal in the men's doubles event at the 1983 FIL European Luge Natural Track Championships in St. Konrad, Austria.

References

External links
Natural track European Championships results 1970-2006.

Austrian male lugers
Living people
Year of birth missing (living people)
Place of birth missing (living people)